The Soviet Union men's national under-16 basketball team was a men's junior national basketball team of the Soviet Union. It represented the country in international under-16 (under age 16) basketball competitions, until the dissolution of the Soviet Union in 1991. After 1992, the successor countries all set up their own national teams.

FIBA U16 European Championship participations

See also
Soviet Union men's national basketball team
Soviet Union men's national under-19 basketball team
Soviet Union women's national under-16 basketball team
Russia men's national basketball team
Russia men's national under-17 basketball team

References

U
Men's national under-16 basketball teams